Bann Rowing Club is the rowing club of Coleraine, Northern Ireland. It is situated on the east bank of the Lower Bann river in Hanover Place south of the Old Town Bridge. Founded in 1842, Bann is one of the oldest rowing clubs in all of Ireland.

The Club competes regularly in national regattas across Ireland including the annual National Championships, Cork.

Notable members
Bann is also known for its success at producing Olympic oarsmen including Alan Campbell, Richard Chambers and Peter Chambers. At the London 2012 Olympics Alan won a Bronze Medal in the Men's Single Scull; Richard and Peter both won a Silver Medal in the Lightweight Men's Four.

Honours

Henley Royal Regatta

References

External links
http://www.bannrowingclub.org.uk/

Rowing clubs in Northern Ireland
Sports clubs established in 1842
1842 establishments in the United Kingdom